Xishuangbanna Gasa International Airport  is an airport serving Jinghong, Xishuangbanna Dai Autonomous Prefecture, Yunnan, China. The airport derives its name from Gasa town (ᦂᦱᧆ ᦌᦻ) of Jinghong, where it is situated. It is also known as Jinghong Airport.

Airlines and destinations

See also
List of airports in China

References

Yunnan Airport Group - Reference
World Aero Data: GASA -- ZPJH

Airports in Yunnan
Airports established in 1990
1990 establishments in China
Transport in Xishuangbanna Dai Autonomous Prefecture